

Becoming Mexican American: Ethnicity, Culture, and Identity in Chicano Los Angeles, 1900-1945, written by George J. Sánchez and published in 1993 by Oxford University Press, explores the experiences of Mexican Americans in Los Angeles during the early 20th century. Sánchez provides a detailed look at Mexican Americans' lives, examining how they navigated living in a new country, including discrimination, poverty, and cultural displacement, and how they created a distinct Mexican American identity.

One of the book's key themes is the concept of "transculturation," which refers to the process of adapting to a new culture while also maintaining elements of one's own culture. Sanchez argues that Mexican-Americans were able to create a unique identity influenced by Mexican and American cultures, which was shaped by the experience of immigration and discrimination.

The book is divided into chapters, organized chronologically, each dealing with a different aspect of the Mexican-American experience. Sánchez draws on a wide range of sources, including oral histories, government documents, and newspapers, to provide a detailed picture of the lives of Mexican Americans during this period.

Academic journal reviews

About the author
 
George J. Sánchez is a historian and author; their research focuses on the experiences of Mexican Americans in the United States. He is currently a professor of American Studies and Ethnicity and History at the University of Southern California. In 1989 he received a Ph.D. in history from Stanford University; he previously earned his B.A. in History and Sociology from Harvard University.

See also
 Cannery Women, Cannery Lives: Mexican Women, Unionization, and the California Food Processing Industry, 1930-1950
 Black and Brown: African Americans and the Mexican Revolution, 1910-1920

References

Notes

Citations

External links
 Book page; Oxford University Press.

Books about Los Angeles
Books about California